Gordon Wallace may refer to:

 Gordon Wallace (judge) (1900–1987), first President of the New South Wales Court of Appeal
 Gordon Wallace (boxer) (1929–2015), Canadian boxer of the 1950s
 Gordon Wallace (footballer, born 1943), Scottish football player and manager (Dundee, Dundee United, Raith Rovers)
 Gordon Wallace (footballer, born 1944), Scottish football player (Liverpool)
 Gordon Wallace (footballer, born 1949), Scottish football player (Raith Rovers, Dundee United)
 Gordon Wallace (soccer) (born 1955), Scottish-born Canadian international soccer player
 Gordon Wallace (professor) (born 1958), scientist in the field of electromaterials
 Gordon Wallace (American football) (1899–1931)